Arthur Wesley Dow (1857 – December 13, 1922) was an American painter, printmaker, photographer and an arts educator.

Early life 
Arthur Wesley Dow was born in Ipswich, Massachusetts, in 1857. Dow received his first art training in 1880 from Anna K. Freeland of Worcester, Massachusetts. The following year, Dow continued his studies in Boston with James M. Stone, a former student of Frank Duveneck and Gustave Bouguereau. In 1884, he went to Paris for his early art education, studying at the Académie Julian, under the supervision of the academic artists Gustave Boulanger and Jules Joseph Lefebvre.

Career 
In 1893, Dow was appointed assistant curator of the Japanese collection at the Museum of Fine Arts, Boston under Ernest Fenellosa. Fenellosa introduced Dow to ukiyo‑e, the woodblock prints of Japan, which greatly influenced his later works.

He accepted commissions for posters and other commercial work. In 1895, he designed the poster to advertise the Journal of Modern Art and in 1896, he designed the poster for an exhibition of Japanese prints.

Over the course of his career, Dow taught art at a few major American arts training institutions, beginning with the Pratt Institute from 1896 to 1903. He also taught at the New York Art Students League, from 1898 to 1903. In 1900, Dow founded and served as the director of the Ipswich Summer School of Art in Ipswich, Massachusetts. From 1904 to 1922, he was a professor of fine arts at Columbia University Teachers College.

Death and legacy 
Dow died on December 13, 1922, in his home in New York City. He was interred in the Old North Burying Ground in Ipswich, Massachusetts. He was survived by his wife Eleanor Pearson, whom he married in 1893.

Influence on others
Dow taught many of America's leading artists and craftspeople, including: Georgia O'Keeffe, Shirley Williamson, Charles Sheeler, Charles J. Martin, two of the Overbeck Sisters, Delle Miller,  Charles Burchfield, Isabelle Percy West and Walter King Stone. One of his pupils, the educator and printmaker Pedro Joseph de Lemos, adapted and widely disseminated Dow's theories in dozens of theoretical and instructional publications (1918–1950) for art schools.

Dow also had influence at the Byrdcliffe Colony.

Collections 
His work is represented in public museum collections, including Amon Carter Museum of American Art, Fort Worth, Texas; the Metropolitan Museum of Art, New York City; Brooklyn Museum, Brooklyn, New York City; Museum of Fine Arts, Boston; Wadsworth Athenaeum, Hartford, Connecticut; Herbert F. Johnson Museum of Art, Cornell University, Ithaca, New York; the San Diego Museum of Art; the Fine Arts Museums of San Francisco, San Francisco, California; the Smithsonian American Art Museum, Washington, D.C.; Columbia University, New York; Ipswich Historical Society; Museum of the American Arts and Crafts Movement; and many other public and private collection.

Ideas on teaching art
His ideas were quite revolutionary for the period; Dow taught that rather than copying nature, individuals should create art through elements of the composition, such as line, mass, and color. He wanted leaders of the public to see art is a living force for all in everyday life, not as a sort of traditional ornament for the few. Dow suggested that the American lack of interest in art would improve if art was presented as a means of self-expression. He wanted people to be able to include personal experience in creating art.

His ideas on art were published in his 1899 book Composition: A Series of Exercises in Art Structure for the Use of Students and Teachers.  The following extracts are from the prefatory chapter "Beginnings" to the second edition of this book (1912):

Composition ... expresses the idea upon which the method here presented is founded - the "putting together" of lines, masses and colors to make a harmony. ... Composition, building up of harmony, is the fundamental process in all the fine arts. ... A natural method is of exercises in progressive order, first building up very simple harmonies ... Such a method of study includes all kinds of drawing, design and painting.  It offers a means of training for the creative artist, the teacher or one who studies art for the sake of culture.

Bibliography
Works by Dow

References

External links

 
 
 Georgia O'Keeffe Museum.
 Arthur Wesley Dow and American Arts & Crafts, March 10 through June 18, 2000. Dow Papers Online at the Smithsonian Archives of American Art  Arthur Wesley
 Marsh Creek an example of Dow's art
 Online exhibition of Arthur Dow's art
 Two Red Roses Foundation

1857 births
1922 deaths
Art Students League of New York faculty
Académie Julian alumni
Pont-Aven painters
19th-century American painters
American male painters
20th-century American painters
American landscape painters
Columbia University faculty
Teachers College, Columbia University faculty
People from Ipswich, Massachusetts
20th-century American printmakers
Woodcut designers
19th-century American male artists
20th-century American male artists